Bruce Baillie (September 24, 1931 – April 10, 2020) was an American experimental filmmaker. He was born in Aberdeen, South Dakota in 1931 and died on April 10, 2020 in Camano Island, Washington.

Work
Baillie founded Canyon Cinema in San Francisco in 1961.

Also, in 1961, Baillie, along with friend and fellow cinematic artist Chick Strand, founded San Francisco Cinematheque.

His body of cinematic work includes Quick Billy, To Parsifal, Mass for the Dakota Sioux, Castro Street, All My Life, Valentin de las Sierras, and Tung.

Legacy
In 1991, he was the recipient of AFI's Maya Deren Independent Film and Video Artists Award.

His 1966 short film Castro Street was selected in 1992 for the United States National Film Registry.

In 2012, Stanford University acquired Baillie's archives and the archives of Canyon Cinema. The Academy Film Archive has preserved a number of Bruce Baillie's films, including Castro Street, Still Life, Cherry Yogurt, Little Girl, Roslyn Romance (Is It Really True?), and Quick Billy Rolls.

Filmography
 On Sundays (1960–1961)
 David Lynn's Sculpture (1961, unfinished)
 Mr. Hayashi (1961)
 The Gymnasts (1961)
 Friend Fleeing (1962)
 Everyman (1962)
 News #3 (1962)
 Have You Thought of Talking to the Director? (1962)
 Here I Am (1962)
 A Hurrah for Soldiers (1962–1963)
 To Parsifal (1963)
 Mass for the Dakota Sioux (1964)
 The Brookfield Recreation Center (1964)
 Quixote (1964–1965, revised 1967)
 Yellow Horse (1965)
 Tung (1966)
 Castro Street (1966) filmed on Castro Street in Richmond, California
 All My Life (1966)
 Still Life (1966)
 Termination (1966)
 Port Chicago Vigil (1966)
 Show Leader (1966)
 Valentin de las Sierras (1971)
 Quick Billy (1971)
 Roslyn Romance (Is It Really True?): Intro. 1 & II (1978)
 The Holy Scrolls (completed 1998)

References

External links

Bruce Baillie's Official Website
Bruce Baillie at Canyon Cinema

Bruce Baillie's official YouTube channel
Five collected films by Bruce Baillie (including Castro Street and All My Life (latter with soundtrack by Ella Fitzgerald) on YouTube)

1931 births
2020 deaths
People from Aberdeen, South Dakota
American experimental filmmakers
Film directors from South Dakota